"These Words" (also known as "These Words (I Love You, I Love You)") is a song by British singer-songwriter Natasha Bedingfield. It was written by Steve Kipner, Andrew Frampton, Wayne Wilkins and Bedingfield for her 2004 debut album, Unwritten. The song is the album's opening track, and was released as its second single. "These Words" details Bedingfield's lack of inspiration and her reaction to pressure from her record label to produce a hit song.

"These Words" was released as the album's second international single and as the lead single in North America. The single sold well, reached the top forty worldwide, and topped the charts in both Ireland and the United Kingdom. It was certified platinum in the United States and Australia, and was nominated for "Best British Single" at the 2005 BRIT Awards. The song was very well received by music critics, and was frequently cited as a highlight of the album.

Background and writing
Bedingfield began recording her debut album in mid-2003, following the signing of a recording contract with Sony BMG earlier that year. She was determined not to be shaped into "some music biz pigeonhole" and wanted to write songs that were "organic, different and real". Bedingfield began collaborating with Steve Kipner, Andrew Frampton and Wayne Wilkins in London and Los Angeles, but their sessions were largely unproductive due to Bedingfield's writer's block and the pressure that she felt to produce a hit song. Frustrated, she began to sing "I love you, I love you, I love you" over and over. She was at "wit's end and just wanted to say what I meant in a simple way, without using all those flowery words." The line that Bedingfield sang out of frustration became the song's hook and its subject matter inspired by her real life difficulty writing a love song.

Critical reception
"These Words" was generally very well received by contemporary pop music critics. PlayLouder's Daniel Robson described the song as a "compelling chunk of popply joy", while AllMusic wrote that the track was "near-perfect" and merged "the rhythms and flavors of hip-hop and R&B with unique melodies and Bedingfield's vocal confidence". The BBC called it a "classic love song" with a "really catchy tune", and commented that it was worthy of reaching number one on the UK singles chart. Josh Timmermann of Stylus Magazine called it "best single so far this year", and David Welsh of musicOMH.com wrote that the song had a "virally-infectious chorus and (relatively) clever wordplay."

Stylus Magazine Colin Cooper ranked "These Words" at number thirteen on his list of the Top 20 Singles of 2004 and About.com ranked the song at number five on its list of the Top 10 Most Memorable Pop Song Lyrics 2005. The website wrote that Bedingfield's naming of the famous poets George Byron, Percy Bysshe Shelley, and John Keats in the song enables the listener to "almost hear the classic poetry over a drum machine" as Bedingfield sings.

Bedingfield's mispronunciation of "hyperbole" as "hyperbowl" has been regularly pointed out throughout the years, including in The Guardian ten years after the song's release.

Commercial performance
"These Words" entered the UK Singles Chart on 22 August 2004 at number one, remaining on the chart for thirteen weeks. It maintained the number one position for two weeks. In the United Kingdom, Bedingfield and her brother, pop-singer Daniel Bedingfield, became the first sister and brother to achieve separate number one singles. The track also charted at number one in Ireland, remaining on the singles chart for seventeen weeks.

Across Europe, "These Words" was largely successful, reaching number one in Poland, number two in Austria, Germany and Norway, and the top ten in the Netherlands, Sweden and Switzerland. Elsewhere, the song peaked within the top ten on the majority of the charts it entered. In Australia, "These Words" debuted at number six and reached a peak position of number five three weeks later. On the 2004 ARIA end of the year chart, the song charted at number forty-nine and was certified gold. In New Zealand the single performed stronger, reaching number two on the singles chart.

"These Words" performed moderately well in North America. The single debuted at number one hundred on the Billboard Hot 100 on 2 July 2005 and reached a peak position at number seventeen, remaining on the chart for twenty weeks. The song did well on pop-oriented charts, reaching number nine on the Pop 100 and number ten on the Top 40 Mainstream. "These Words" was helped on the Hot 100 by its strong digital downloads, peaking at number seven on the Hot Digital Songs chart. The single had crossover success in the dance charts, reaching number one on the Hot Dance Airplay chart and number thirty-five on the Hot Dance Club Play chart.

Music videos
Two music videos were produced for the international and North American markets.

International version
The song's international music video was directed by Scott Lyon and Sophie Muller and premiered in July 2004. The video features several sequences. It opens with Bedingfield sitting at a table in her Spanish villa, in Málaga, frustrated by her inability to find inspiration to write a song. Afterwards, there are multiple scenes which include her walking and dancing through the villa in colorful outfits, sitting by the swimming pool, lying on the beach and being surrounded by dancing chairs, dancing radios, dancing books in the library, and multiple versions of herself on a sofa. The video concludes with Bedingfield scribbling in her notebook on the roof of her villa. Her scribblings lead her boyfriend to her home where she goes to the balcony, telling him "I love you, is that okay?".

During each sequence of the video, Natasha is wearing different outfits and haircuts, with the only constant being that she is always barefoot.

North American version
The North American music video was directed by Chris Milk and filmed in Rio de Janeiro, Brazil, in March 2005. The music video, however, was discarded by the record label, though this version won four Annual MVPA Awards. The video begins with Bedingfield waking up next to a boombox, dressing, brushing her teeth and leaving her home with the boombox. While performing on Copacabana beach, she kicks her boombox, which comes alive and begins to dance, and she leaves the beach and walks down the street. The video concludes with Bedingfield arriving back home to a house full of dancing boomboxes in the bedroom.

An alternate version of the North American video was directed by Jim Gable using much of the footage from the original. The boomboxes featured in the video are animated to look like drawings and a performance by Bedingfield in a room with flowing white drapery has been added. The video debuted in June 2005 and proved successful on US video chart programs. It debuted on MTV's Total Request Live on 28 June 2005 at number ten and remained on the program for a total of six days. VH1 ranked the video at number twenty-two on its Top 40 Videos of 2005 countdown.

Formats and track listings

Enhanced CD single
 "These Words" – 3:34 
 "These Words" (Bimbo Jones Remix) – 6:56
 "The One That Got Away" – 4:16
 "Single" (Radio 1's Live Lounge Recording) – 3:19
 "These Words" (Video)
 "These Words" (The Making of the Video)

CD single
 "These Words" – 3:34 
 "Single" (Radio 1's Live Lounge Recording) – 3:19

Personnel
The following people contributed to "These Words".

 Natasha Bedingfield – guitar, lead and backing vocals
 Wayne Wilkins – keyboards, engineering, programming
 Andrew Frampton – keyboards, programming
 Mark "Spike" Stent – mixing

 David Treahearn, Rob Haggart – mixing assistant
 Herb Powers – mastering
 Katherine Lanson – drums

Charts

Weekly charts

Year-end charts

Certifications

Release history

References

External links
 natashabedingfield.com — official website

2004 singles
2004 songs
2005 singles
Music videos directed by Chris Milk
Music videos directed by Sophie Muller
Natasha Bedingfield songs
Number-one singles in Scotland
UK Singles Chart number-one singles
Irish Singles Chart number-one singles
Songs written by Steve Kipner
Songs written by Natasha Bedingfield
Songs written by Wayne Wilkins
Songs written by Andrew Frampton (songwriter)
Phonogenic Records singles